This partial list of city nicknames in Pennsylvania compiles the aliases, sobriquets and slogans that cities, boroughs, and towns in Pennsylvania are known by (or have been known by historically), officially and unofficially, to municipal governments, local people, outsiders or their tourism boards or chambers of commerce. City nicknames can help in establishing a civic identity, helping outsiders recognize a community or attracting people to a community because of its nickname; promote civic pride; and build community unity. Nicknames and slogans that successfully create a new community "ideology or myth" are also believed to have economic value. Their economic value is difficult to measure, but there are anecdotal reports of cities that have achieved substantial economic benefits by "branding" themselves by adopting new slogans.

Some unofficial nicknames are positive, while others are derisive. Many of the unofficial nicknames listed here have been in use for a long time or have gained wide currency.
 
Allentown
Band City USA
Peanut City
The Queen City. "Queen City's origins as an Allentown nickname are obscure. It is believed to come from a turn-of-the-century competition hosted by the Allentown Chamber of Commerce. The winning entry was said to be Queen City."
Silk City
Truck Capital of the World
Bethlehem – Christmas City, USA
Butler – Birthplace of the Jeep
Erie
 The Flagship City
 The Gem City
Hanover – Snack Capital of the World
Hershey
Chocolate Capital of the World
Chocolate Town
The Sweetest Place on EarthTagline Guru City Branding Survey , Tagline Guru website, accessed August 18, 2009
Indiana – Christmas Tree Capital of the WorldHistory of Indiana County, IndianaPC.org website, accessed December 21, 2008
Johnstown
The Flood City
The Friendly City
Lancaster – The Red Rose City
New Castle – Fireworks Capital
Philadelphia 
The Athens of America – "References can be found as early as 1733 when the Library Company’s directors wrote, “May your Philadelphia be the future of Athens in America."
The Big Scrapple
The City of Brotherly LoveBarry Popik, Smoky City , barrypopik.com website, March 27, 2005 – a literal translation of the city's name from the original Greek language
The City That Loves You Back
 City of Homes
 Filthadelphia or Filthydelphia
Killadelphia
Philly
Quaker City
The Workshop of the World
Pittsburgh
 Birmingham of America
The 'Burgh
 The City of Bridges 
The City of Champions
Iron City
Shitsburgh – most famously used by actress Sienna Miller in a magazine interview
The Smoky City
The Steel City
Punxsutawney – Weather Capital of the World
Reading
Baseballtown
Pretzel Capital of the World
Pretzel City
Scranton – The Electric City
State College – Happy Valley       
Wilkes-Barre – Diamond City
York – The White Rose City

See also
 List of city nicknames in the United States
 Lists of nicknames – nickname list articles on Wikipedia

References

Pennsylvania cities and towns
Populated places in Pennsylvania
City nicknames